Nayrab, Idlib  is a village located in Idlib Nahiyah in Idlib District, Idlib Governorate, Syria.  According to the Syria Central Bureau of Statistics (CBS), Nayrab, Idlib had a population of 2675 in the 2004 census.

References 

Populated places in Idlib District